Rafi Levi (22 February 1938 – 25 February 2021) was an Israeli footballer who played as a striker. He spent most of his career in Maccabi Tel Aviv.

Football career
Rafi Levi won the Season Top Scorer award twice. First in the 1957–58 season with 19 goals and the second time around during the 1959–60 season with 15 goals. He also was among the top players leading Maccabi Tel Aviv to two championships and in the 1955–56 and 1957–58 seasons, and two Israeli State Cups (1958 and 1959). Later he played in Australia and South Africa, and retired from football in 1972.

Levi made 17 appearances in Israel national team. One of the best games was the victory over the Yugoslavia in the 1960 Summer Olympics qualification. In the game Levi scored two goals and was considered one of the heroes (along with the Israeli goalkeeper Ya'akov Hodorov). This victory, one of the most surprising in the history of Israeli football, caused a great wave of elation among Israeli sports fans.

Honours 
 Israeli Championship: 1955–56, 1957–58
 State Cup: 1955, 1958, 1959
 National South African Championship: 1960, 1964, 1966, 1968
 South African Cup: 1965, 1966, 1967
 New South Wales Federation Championship: 1961, 1962
 New South Wales Federation Cup: 1961, 1963

See also
Sports in Israel

References 

1938 births
2021 deaths
Israeli footballers
Israel international footballers
Association football forwards
Maccabi Tel Aviv F.C. players
highlands Park F.C. players
1960 AFC Asian Cup players
Rangers F.C. (South Africa) players
hapoel Ra'anana A.F.C. players
Sydney City players
Israeli expatriate footballers
Expatriate soccer players in Australia
Expatriate soccer players in South Africa
Israeli expatriate sportspeople  in Australia
Israeli expatriate sportspeople in South Africa